Richard Cory Hastings (born 18 May 1977) is a former Canadian soccer player and current manager of Highland League side Inverurie Loco Works. 

He played for Inverness Caledonian Thistle, Ross County, Grazer AK, MVV Maastricht, Hamilton Academical and Brora Rangers.

Hastings played 59 times for the Canadian national team. Hastings was a member of the Canada side which won the 2000 CONCACAF Gold Cup, and later represented his country at the 2001 Confederations Cup, the 2002 CONCACAF Gold Cup, 2005 CONCACAF Gold Cup, 2007 CONCACAF Gold Cup and the 2009 CONCACAF Gold Cup.

Richard's nephew, Gabriel, signed for Caley Thistle as a youth team player on 14 May 2018.

Club career
Hastings was born in Prince George, British Columbia, Canada. Hastings spent his early years in Vancouver. When he was 7 years old he and his English parents moved to Middlesbrough, England. He went to Millburn Academy in Inverness.

Hastings began his career as a teenager with Nairn County before signing for Inverness Caledonian Thistle, for whom he made 106 appearances as a defender. During this spell in Inverness he was an important player for the team and became Caley Thistle's first full-time player. A constant member of the squad that won promotion to the Scottish First Division, Hastings was also part of the team that beat Celtic in the Scottish Cup in 2000.

In 2001 Richie Hastings joined Ross County, before spells at Grazer AK and Maastricht. In 2004, he returned to Caley Thistle. He was the only international capped player at Inverness Caledonian Thistle after the departure of Marius Niculae. In his second spell at Caley Thistle he scored twice: against Dunfermline in the league and Morton in the Scottish League Cup.

Hastings was released from his contract with Hamilton at the end of the 2009–10 season. On 11 February 2011 Hastings announced his retirement as a player. The announcement was not surprising, as the 33-year-old had been without a club since the end of the 2009–10 season.

In 2012 Hastings came out of retirement and signed for Highland League side Brora Rangers.

International career
Hastings played at the 1997 FIFA World Youth Championship in Malaysia, alongside Paul Stalteri and Jason Bent.

He made his senior debut for Canada in a May 1998 friendly match against Macedonia and, up to 22 November 2009, has earned a total of 57 caps, scoring 1 goal. He has represented Canada in 10 FIFA World Cup qualification matches. Hastings' only international goal was the golden goal in Canada's 2–1 win over Mexico in the quarter-final of the 2000 CONCACAF Gold Cup, a tournament Canada went on to win. Hastings was named Rookie of the Tournament.

He was also in the squad for the 2007 CONCACAF Gold Cup playing in a central-defence position and was also named in the "Team of the Tournament" line-up. He was also selected in the 2009 Canadian Gold Cup roster.

Hastings last appearance in the Canada jersey was in a friendly 29 May 2010 against Venezuela, the game ended as a 1–1 away draw.

International goals
Scores and results list Canada's goal tally first.

Honours

Canada
CONCACAF Gold Cup:  2000
CONCACAF U-20 Championship:  1996

Individual
 CONCACAF Gold Cup All-Tournament team: 2007

References

External links
 
 
  (archive)

1977 births
2000 CONCACAF Gold Cup players
2001 FIFA Confederations Cup players
2002 CONCACAF Gold Cup players
2003 CONCACAF Gold Cup players
2007 CONCACAF Gold Cup players
2009 CONCACAF Gold Cup players
Association football defenders
Austrian Football Bundesliga players
Brora Rangers F.C. players
Canada men's international soccer players
Canada men's youth international soccer players
Canadian expatriate soccer players
Canadian expatriate sportspeople in Austria
Canadian expatriate sportspeople in the Netherlands
Canadian people of English descent
Canadian soccer players
CONCACAF Gold Cup-winning players
Eerste Divisie players
English expatriates in Austria
English expatriates in the Netherlands
English footballers
English people of Canadian descent
Expatriate footballers in Austria
Expatriate footballers in Scotland
Expatriate footballers in the Netherlands
Hamilton Academical F.C. players
Inverness Caledonian Thistle F.C. players
Grazer AK players
Living people
MVV Maastricht players
Nairn County F.C. players
People educated at Millburn Academy
Sportspeople from Prince George, British Columbia
Ross County F.C. players
Soccer people from British Columbia
Scottish Football League players
Scottish Premier League players
Canadian expatriate sportspeople in Scotland
Scottish football managers
Highland Football League managers